is a Japanese publishing company and bookstore, founded in 1909.

External links
Official site

Book publishing companies of Japan
Publishing companies established in 1909
Retail companies established in 1909
Mass media in Yokohama
Japanese companies established in 1909